Thorny Creek is an unincorporated community in Pocahontas County, West Virginia, United States.

Thorny Creek is also home to the Thorny Creek Mountain Summit. The mountain stands at about 3,366 feet above sea level.

References

Unincorporated communities in Pocahontas County, West Virginia
Unincorporated communities in West Virginia